Mr. Cohen Takes a Walk, also known as Father Takes a Walk, is a 1935 British comedy film directed by William Beaudine, starring Paul Graetz, Violet Farebrother, and Chili Bouchier, and based on a novel by Mary Roberts Rinehart. This was one of many "quota quickies" produced by Warner Bros. in the UK.

Plot
Jake Cohen, the owner of a department store (Graetz), goes on the road, and leaves it under the control of his children, only to have to return when they fight with each other on the eve of a worker's strike.

Cast
 Paul Graetz as Jake Cohen
 Violet Farebrother as Rachel Cohen
 Chili Bouchier as Julia Levine
 Mickey Brantford as Jack Cohen
 Ralph Truman as Sam Cohen
 Barry Livesey as Joe Levine
 Sam Springson as Abraham Levy
 Kenneth Villiers as Bob West
 Meriel Forbes as Sally O'Connor
 George Merritt as Pat O'Connor

References

External links

1935 films
1935 comedy films
1930s English-language films
Films directed by William Beaudine
British comedy films
British black-and-white films
Films based on works by Mary Roberts Rinehart
1930s British films